Cluster were a German musical duo consisting of Hans-Joachim Roedelius and Dieter Moebius, formed in 1971 and associated with West Germany's krautrock and kosmische music scenes. Born from the earlier Berlin-based group Kluster, they relocated in 1971 into the countryside village of Forst, Lower Saxony, where they built a studio and collaborated with musicians such as Conny Plank, Brian Eno, and Michael Rother; with the latter, they formed the influential side-project Harmonia. After first disbanding in 1981, Cluster reunited several times: from 1989 to 1997, and from 2007 to 2010.

AllMusic described the group as "the most important and consistently underrated space rock unit of the '70s." Music historian Julian Cope places three Cluster albums—Cluster II (1972), Zuckerzeit (1974), and Sowiesoso (1976)—in his Krautrock Top 50 and The Wire places the debut album in its "One Hundred Records That Set the World on Fire".

History

1971–1972: Early works 
Dieter Moebius, Hans-Joachim Roedelius and Conrad Schnitzler formed Kluster in 1969 after the three had met at the Zodiak Free Arts Lab. This trio released three albums, Klopfzeichen, Zwei-Osterei and Eruption. When Schnitzler left the group, Roedelius and Moebius became Cluster. They were joined by Conny Plank on their debut self-titled release in 1971. They continued as a duo thereafter but worked extensively with producer/engineer Plank until his death in 1987.

Cluster's first release, an eponymous debut in 1971 on Philips, was the first major label release for the musicians. Previous Kluster works had been small or private label releases with no more than 300 copies pressed and sold. This album and the 1972 follow-up were a musical bridge between the avant-garde, discordant, proto-industrial sound of Kluster and the softer and more controlled ambient and rock sounds of their mid to late '70s albums. Cluster (later reissued as Cluster '71) has little or no discernible melody or beat. Allmusic review describes it, in part as "...a dislocating, disorienting meld of random space music, industrial noise, proto-ambient atmospherics, feedback, and soundwash..." The first album is also the only Cluster release on which Conny Plank is listed as a full third member of the band. He is credited as a composer and producer on Cluster II. Cluster signed with the influential Krautrock label Brain Records for their second release, a relationship which would continue through 1975.

1973–1979: Harmonia, Zuckerzeit, and Eno 

In 1971 the duo moved to the rural village of Forst, West Germany to live in several Renaissance-era farmhouses and build their own studio. There Cluster and Neu! co-founder Michael Rother recorded two albums under the name Harmonia: Musik von Harmonia in 1974 and Deluxe in 1975, both released on Brain. This new trio also toured and a new CD drawn from this period, Live 1974 was released on the UK-based Grönland Records label on 22 October 2007 and on the San Francisco based Water Records label in the United States on 11 December 2007.

After the release of the first Harmonia album and a period on tour, Rother returned to working with Klaus Dinger and an expanded Neu! lineup in order to complete his contractual obligations. In his absence Cluster went back to work as a duo, releasing Zuckerzeit later in 1974. Zuckerzeit sounds different from any other Cluster album, with clearly defined melody and beat and a rhythmic sound, at times approaching the Motorik style of Neu! Pitchfork Media places Zuckerzeit at number 63 in their "Top 100 Albums of the 1970s".

After the release of Deluxe Moebius, Roedelius, and Rother met in the studio again in 1976 and worked with Brian Eno. The resulting album, Tracks and Traces, was not released until 1997. Eno had been impressed with both Musik von Harmonia and Zuckerzeit before and had joined Harmonia once on tour in 1974, jamming with the group at The Fabrik in Hamburg.

In a 1997 interview, Hans-Joachim Roedelius spoke about the influence Rother had on Cluster's musical direction, on Zuckerzeit, and on subsequent releases:"Michael, as well as Eno, gave a lot and had a certain focus regarding our common work... Obviously working with Michael changed my and Moebius' focus, I don't know if Michael got the same benefit from working with us as we did working with him."

The period from 1976–1979 was Cluster's most productive, with the four albums released during those four years receiving the most critical acclaim of any of Cluster's works. 1976 also marked Cluster's move to Hamburg based Sky Records. Their first release for Sky was Sowiesoso, a highly creative album of gentler melodies recorded in just two days.

In 1977 the duo joined with Brian Eno for recording sessions at Conny Plank's studio. The first release from those sessions was the even softer Cluster & Eno. Guest musicians on the album included Can bassist Holger Czukay and Asmus Tietchens on synthesizer. The association with Eno brought Cluster a much wider audience and international attention. The second album drawn from the Cluster & Eno sessions, After the Heat, released on Sky in 1978, featured a much wider variety of styles, including three tracks with vocals by Eno. Holger Czukay again played bass on one track, "Tzima N'arki" which featured the vocals of the Eno track "King's Lead Hat" recorded backwards. Roedelius also began releasing solo material during this period, beginning with Durch die Wüste for Sky in 1978.

Cluster's 1979 release Grosses Wasser was produced by ex-Tangerine Dream member Peter Baumann and once again featured a wide variety of styles, including some of the most avant-garde material since the demise of Kluster, particularly during the middle section of the title track, which occupied all of side two.

1980–1989: Curiosum and related projects 
On 12 June 1980 Cluster performed at the Wiener Festwochen Alternativ with Joshi Farnbauer. The performance was recorded and released as a limited edition cassette on the British York House Records (YHR) label and later in Germany on the Transmitter label of "Grüne Kraft" owner Werner Pieper. This one and only Cluster & Farnbauer release was titled Live in Vienna. The style of the music is highly experimental and discordant and very reminiscent of Moebius and Roedelius' early work with Conrad Schnitzler in Kluster. Live in Vienna was not released on CD until 2010, though two sections, each between 15 and 16 minutes long, were included as bonus tracks on the Hypnotic CD reissues of the first two Kluster albums, Klopfzeichen and Zwei-Osterei.

Also in 1980, Sky Records reissued the first Cluster release with new artwork and a new title: Cluster '71. That same year, Dieter Moebius teamed with former Cluster member, engineer and producer Conny Plank on the album Rastakraut Pasta, released on Sky. A second Moebius & Plank album, Material, was released in 1981.

Cluster's 1981 release Curiosum lives up to its name, with the seven tracks of offbeat and unusual melodies. Curiosum was Cluster's last release for Sky. It was also the final collaboration between Moebius and Roedelius before an eight-year-long hiatus.

During their hiatus from Cluster both Moebius and Roedelius continued to record and tour. They produced both solo albums and collaborations with other artists.

Moebius continued to work with Conny Plank. Moebius, Plank and Guru Guru drummer Mani Neumeier recorded the African-influenced, rhythmic album Zero Set, released by Sky in 1983. That same year, Moebius and Plank teamed with Mayo Thompson to record Ludwig's Law, which was not released until 1998. The final Moebius & Plank collaboration, En Route was recorded in 1986 but not released until 1995 on Curious Music. Plank died of cancer in 1987.

Roedelius released numerous solo albums and collaborations during this period, including continuing his Selbstportrait series of introspective ambient albums.

Sky Records, faced with no new material to release, turned to compilation albums to fill the gap. The 1984 release Stimmungen featured material from Sowiesoso and Grosses Wasser. In addition, two compilations credited to Eno, Moebius, Roedelius, and Plank, titled Begegnungen and Begegnungen II were released in 1984 and 1985 respectively. These collections included material from Sowiesoso, Cluster & Eno and After the Heat and also contained material from Moebius and Roedelius solo albums as well as the three Moebius & Plank albums released at that time. Cluster also had their first U.S. release in 1985: Relativity Records issued Old Land, credited to Cluster and Brian Eno and containing a mix of material from Cluster & Eno and After the Heat.

1989–1997: First reunion 
In 1989 Cluster reunited, recording Apropos Cluster in 1989 and 1990. The album was released on the Curious Music label in 1991. Apropos Cluster is musically and structurally similar to Grosses Wasser, with four short tracks followed by the nearly 22 minute long, more experimental title piece. Apropos Cluster was Cluster's first album to be released initially in the U.S., and it was followed by American reissues of their Sky and Brain catalogs during the early and mid '90s.

Cluster's next album was the 1995 release One Hour. This album featured a single, long musical piece, the longest ever recorded by Cluster, divided into 11 tracks on the CD. One Hour is structured much like the title track of Grosses Wasser, with short, soft melodic sections at the beginning and the end sandwiching a longer experimental central section. One Hour was the last studio album released by Cluster until 2009, 14 years later.

Cluster used the liner notes for One Hour to pay tribute to the late Konrad (Conny) Plank:
"However the most creative input and personal support over the years came from Konrad Plank, who was, in effect, a 'silent member in the background'."

In 1996 Cluster had acclaimed concert tours in Japan as well as their first tour of the United States. The concert tours produced musical documents: the albums Japan 1996 Live, released on the Japanese Captain Trip label in 1997 and First Encounter Tour 1996, recorded in the United States and released on the American Purple Pyramid label, also in 1997. Tim Story, best known as a keyboardist and ambient music composer, co-produced Japan 1996 Live and produced First Encounter Tour 1996, an association which would lead to later musical collaboration between Roedelius and Story. After the United States tour Roedelius and Moebius parted.

1997–2007: Hiatus and second reunion 
During the decade that followed Moebius and Roedelius worked on various solo projects and collaborations.

Roedelius continued to record and tour with Aquarello, who released a self-titled live album in 1998. In 2000 Roedelius reunited with Kluster bandmate Conrad Schnitzler for the first time in nearly three decades. The resulting album, Acon 2000/1 was released on Captain Trip in 2001. Roedelius recorded two albums with Tim Story: The Persistence of Memory in 2000 and Lunz in 2002. A collaboration with Mott the Hoople alumnus Morgan Fisher, Neverless, was released in 2005. A total of 14 solo albums and three additional collaborations were recorded by Roedelius during this period.

Moebius recorded two solo albums during his second hiatus from Cluster: Blotch in 1999 and Nurton in 2006. Moebius also performed and toured with former Harmonia bandmate Michael Rother during this period. He also worked on an album by the new Krautrock supergroup Amon Guru which was released in 2007.

Moebius and Roedelius reunited for a performance at the Kosmische Club in Camden, London on 15 April 2007. They also performed at the opening of documenta 12 on 15 June 2007 in Kassel, Germany and the fourth annual More Ohr Less festival in Lunz, Austria on 10 August 2007. From September to November 2007 Cluster had additional concert performances in Germany, Switzerland, Norway, Estonia, and the Netherlands. Roedelius also gave a solo concert performance in Ojai, California in the United States. Moebius and Roedelius have also reunited with Michael Rother and the first Harmonia concert in more than 30 years took place in Berlin on 27 November 2007. They performed at the opening of documenta 12, a major exhibition of modern and contemporary art held every five years in Kassel, Germany on 15 June 2007.

Cluster performed in the United States for the first time since 1996 at the Detroit Institute of Arts on 16 May 2008 and for the No Fun Fest at the Knitting Factory in New York City on 17 May 2008. They also performed four dates in California from 22 to 25 May.

The first Cluster album since 1997 drawn from their live performance in Berlin on 14 September 2007 was released on Important Records in Spring, 2008.

They performed a one-off live collaboration with Chrome Hoof in London on 21 March 2009. In May 2009 they released Qua, their first studio album in over a decade.

On 22 November 2009, Cluster supported Tortoise at the Royal Festival Hall in London.

On 17 November 2010, Roedelius announced, via email and across social media, that Cluster would split up at end of 2010. Their final concert took place in Minehead, Somerset, England, on 5 December 2010. Roedelius announced that he would perform as "Qluster" with musician Onnen Bock and a trilogy of releases was planned, the first of which was released in May 2011.

Musical style 
Cluster's musical style varied greatly over their career. AllMusic described them as "the most important and consistently underrated space rock unit of the '70s," noting that they first began as "an improv group that used everything from synthesizers to alarm clocks and kitchen utensils in their performances" and later transitioned to produce "many landmark LPs in the field of German space music often termed kosmische." On 1974's Zuckerzeit, the group shifted to a more accessible sound that "combined trippy drum machine rhythms with woozy, pastoral melodies, resulting in a skewed, playful vision of futuristic pop." Cluster later explored ambient music into the 1990s.

Cluster has been widely influential not only to ambient and electronic music artists, but to techno, electronica and popular music as well. Artists and groups whose music has been influenced by Cluster include David Bowie, Robert Rich, John Foxx (formerly of Ultravox), Alex Paterson of The Orb, Coil, Oval, To Rococo Rot, and Mouse on Mars.

Personnel

Core members 
 Hans-Joachim Roedelius (1971–2010)
 Dieter Moebius (1971–2010)
 Conny Plank (as musician, 1971, as composer 1971–1972, as engineer/producer 1971–1978)

Other musicians 
 Brian Eno (1977–1978) – synthesizer, vocals, producer, bass
 Holger Czukay (1977–1978) – bass
 Asmus Tietchens (1977) – synthesizer
 Okko Bekker (1977) – guitar
 Joshi Farnbauer (1980) – percussion
 Stanislaw Michalik (1990) – bass
 Bond Bergland – guitar (1996)
 Paul M. Fox (1996) – musician/engineer
 Tommy Grenas (Johnston) (1996) – musician

Production 
 Peter Baumann (1979) – producer
 William Roper (1979) – engineer
 Felix Jay (1996) – producer
 Tim Story (1996–1997) – producer/engineer
 Hiroshi Okunari (1996) – engineer, Osaka
 Russ Curry (1996) – engineer

Discography

Studio albums 
 1971 Cluster
 1972 Cluster II
 1974 Zuckerzeit
 1976 Sowiesoso
 1977 Cluster & Eno (with Brian Eno)
 1978 After the Heat (by Eno, Moebius and Roedelius)
 1979 Grosses Wasser
 1981 Curiosum
 1991 Apropos Cluster (by Moebius and Roedelius)
 1995 One Hour
 2009 Qua

Live albums 
 1980 Live in Vienna, 1980 (with Joshi Farnbauer)
 1997 Japan 1996 Live
 1997 First Encounter Tour 1996
 2008 Berlin 07
 2015 USA Live
 2017 Konzerte 1972/1977

Compilation albums 
 1984 Begegnungen (with Brian Eno, Conny Plank)
 1984 Stimmungen
 1985 Begegnungen II (with Brian Eno, Conny Plank)
 1985 Old Land (with Brian Eno)
 2007 Box 1 (boxed set)

See also 
List of ambient music artists

References 

Sources
 Bush, John. [ AllMusic: Cluster]. Retrieved 24 February 2005.
 Bush, John [ AllMusic: Harmonia]. Retrieved 2 September 2007.
 Discogs Cluster & Joshi Farnbauer – Live in Vienna. Retrieved 18 August 2007.
 Freeman, Steven and Freeman, Alan. The Crack in the Cosmic Egg (Audion Publications, 1996). . Retrieved 19 August 2007.
 Roedelius, Hans-Joachim. Hans-Joachim Roedelius official homepage. Retrieved 17 August 2007.

External links 
 
 
 Cluster Vision Version at Dublab

Musical groups established in 1971
German electronic music groups
Krautrock musical groups
Ambient music groups
Musical groups reestablished in 2007
Brain Records artists
Musical groups from Berlin